= Gus Ocamposilva =

Colombian-American sculptor duo

Gus & Lina Ocamposilva
- Known for: U.S.A Public Art Sculpture
- Website: www.guslina.com

Gus & Lina Ocamposilva are known for their large-scale public art installations in U.S.A Gus Ocamposilva received formal art training in Spain, where he studied murals at the Massana School in Barcelona and painting techniques at University of Barcelona from 1992 to 1995.

Their work often features vibrant colors and dynamic forms, and they have participated in numerous public art projects across the United States.

== Exhibitions ==
Gus and Lina have been awarded several permanent Public Art projects commissioned by different cities and private collectors in cities such as: New York, Chicago, Las Vegas, Washington, D.C., Atlanta, Miami, among others. Ocamposilva has also have many Juried Public Art Outdoor exhibitions throughout the states: Florida, Mississippi, Tennessee, California, South Dakota, Colorado, North and South Carolina, Missouri, Georgia, New York, Connecticut, which has given them experience working in public art.

== Reviews - Press ==
* City of Sunrise, Florida Government: "Caribbean Garden" Sculpture: New Public Art Transforming Sunrise, FL

* New York City Department of Parks & Recreation: Sculptures Dance On East River Park Promenade, NYC

* Sculpture Digest - 20FT Height Sculpture by Gus and Lina “Reaching for Knowledge”

* Patch - Watch As New Public Art Sculpture Rises Up In Clearwater, FL.

* City of Oldsmar, Florida Government: New public art in Oldsmar-“Winner’s Way,” a 16-foot-tall, Winner's Way Public Art Project.

* City of Oldsmar, Florida Government: Interactive Sculpture Winner's Way, located on the grassy area by the Tampa Road Entry into the Oldsmar Sports Complex, 3120 Tampa Road.

* City of Oldsmar, Florida Government: 𝗔𝗪𝗔𝗥𝗗: 𝗖𝗼𝘂𝗻𝗰𝗶𝗹-𝗠𝗮𝗻𝗮𝗴𝗲𝗿 𝗔𝘄𝗮𝗿𝗱.

* Las Vegas Nevada Government: "Queen of the Arts" The 15-feet tall mirrored sculptures were created by renowned international artists Gus and Lina Ocampolsilva.

* Las Vegas Review Journal News | ‘Queen of Arts’ sculptures unveiled at arts center

* 8 News Now Las Vegas: "Queen of the Arts" sculptures unveiled at West Las Vegas Arts Center

* WUFT / PBS / NPR - News and Public Media for North Central Florida: Alachua County Sports & Events Center hosts grand opening and open house

* Miramar Cultural Center ArtsPark - What does it take to create a work of art?

* Palm Desert California Artist Registry Gus and Lina Ocamposilva.

* City of Jacksonville, Florida - Government's Post - Sculpture "Laura's Flower" was installed at the corner of Laura & Forsyth Streets.

* Augusta Sculpture Trail: Unstoppable Sculptors Gus and Lina Ocamposilva, tells us a little bit about their piece after it is installed on Broad Street in Augusta, GA .

* City of Cape Coral, Florida Government: Unveiling of the Community Redevelopment Agency's new Roundabout Sculpture: "Sailing" .

* City of Suwanee, Georgia Government: Sculpture "Mr. Rings" SculpTour 2022-2024. Sculpture "Sunset" – SculpTour 2011 Sims Lake Park. Sculpture "Magic Rain" – 2011 exhibit .
